Asanda Sishuba (born 13 April 1980 in Langa, Cape Town) is a South African footballer who is currently unattached. He has played for various clubs in Belgium.

International career
Has been selected for South Africa's national team squads on a number of occasions, but has yet to play for his country.

External links
playerhistory

1980 births
Living people
People from Langa, Western Cape
South African soccer players
South African expatriate soccer players
Royal Excel Mouscron players
Royal Antwerp F.C. players
Sint-Truidense V.V. players
Expatriate footballers in Belgium
South African expatriate sportspeople in Belgium
Belgian Pro League players
Association football midfielders
Soccer players from the Western Cape